Spring Valley Lake is a census-designated place in the Victor Valley of the Mojave Desert, within San Bernardino County, California. It is located in Victorville on the Mojave River.

Geography

According to the United States Census Bureau, the CDP covers an area of 3.5 square miles (9.1 km), 3.0 square miles (7.7 km) of it land, and 0.6 square miles (1.5 km) of it (15.95%) water.

Demographics
At the 2010 census Spring Valley Lake had a population of 8,220. The racial makeup of Spring Valley Lake was 6,450 (78.5%) White (68.1% Non-Hispanic White), 403 (4.9%) African American, 55 (0.7%) Native American, 381 (4.6%) Asian, 23 (0.3%) Pacific Islander, 481 (5.9%) from other races, and 427 (5.2%) from two or more races. Hispanic or Latino of any race were 1,528 persons (18.6%).

The whole population lived in households, no one lived in non-institutionalized group quarters, and no one was institutionalized.

There were 3,072 households, 1,054 (34.3%) had children under the age of 18 living in them, 1,808 (58.9%) were opposite-sex married couples living together, 347 (11.3%) had a female householder with no husband present, 159 (5.2%) had a male householder with no wife present.  There were 149 (4.9%) unmarried opposite-sex partnerships, and 22 (0.7%) same-sex married couples or partnerships. 596 households (19.4%) were one person and 294 (9.6%) had someone living alone who was 65 or older. The average household size was 2.68.  There were 2,314 families (75.3% of households); the average family size was 3.06.

The age distribution was 1,932 people (23.5%) under the age of 18, 712 people (8.7%) aged 18 to 24, 1,842 people (22.4%) aged 25 to 44, 2,375 people (28.9%) aged 45 to 64, and 1,359 people (16.5%) who were 65 or older.  The median age was 41.3 years. For every 100 females, there were 95.2 males.  For every 100 females age 18 and over, there were 92.2 males.

There were 3,478 housing units at an average density of 984.6 per square mile, of the occupied units 2,273 (74.0%) were owner-occupied and 799 (26.0%) were rented. The homeowner vacancy rate was 3.2%; the rental vacancy rate was 7.7%.  5,694 people (69.3% of the population) lived in owner-occupied housing units and 2,526 people (30.7%) lived in rental housing units.

According to the 2010 United States Census, Spring Valley Lake had a median household income of $58,317, with 9.5% of the population living below the federal poverty line.

References

Census-designated places in San Bernardino County, California
Populated places in the Mojave Desert
Mojave River
Victor Valley
Census-designated places in California